Charles Rist (1 January 1874, Prilly – 10 January 1955, Versailles) was a French economist. His son is Léonard Rist.

Works
 A History of Economic Doctrines from the Time of the Physiocrats to the Present Day, with Charles Gide; tr. R. Richards.  London, George P. Harrap (1915).

External links
 
 

1874 births
1955 deaths
French economists
People from Lausanne